The 1859 United States Senate election in Massachusetts was held during January 1859. Incumbent Senator Henry Wilson, who had been elected in 1855 to fill the unexpired term of Edward Everett, was re-elected easily to a full term as a member of the Republican Party.

At the time, Massachusetts elected United States senators by a majority vote of each separate house of the Massachusetts General Court, the House and the Senate.

Background
At the time, the Massachusetts legislature was dominated by a coalition of Republican Party and American Party supporters, united in opposition to slavery.

Election in the Senate
On January 11, the State Senate convened and re-elected Wilson overwhelmingly, with 35 votes.

Election in the House
On January 12, the House ratified the Senate result, electing Wilson to a full term in the U.S. Senate.

References

1859
Massachusetts
United States Senate